Adrienne Roy (June 28, 1953 – December 14, 2010) was a comic book color artist who worked mostly for DC Comics. She was largely responsible for coloring the Batman line (Batman and Detective Comics) throughout the 1980s and early 1990s.

Biography
Roy attended an art school in Wayne, New Jersey, where she studied painting techniques. Her first contact with comics was through collecting Marvel Comics' Tomb of Dracula, The Sub-Mariner and Conan the Barbarian. Roy's first work as a comics colorist was assisting her then husband Anthony Tollin, who worked for DC Comics at the time. But it was long-time colorist Jack Adler who would give her the first job at DC: the cover of DC Special Series #8 (featuring the Batman, Deadman and Sgt. Rock team-up). Adler and Sol Harrison (who was also a colorist) were considered by Roy herself as her mentors and both trained her on coloring during her first years at DC.

Roy was also responsible for the coloring on many other titles during that time period: The New Teen Titans, The Warlord, Weird War Tales and Madame Xanadu. Nevertheless, she is predominantly known for her work on the Batman books: Batman, Detective Comics, Batman: Shadow of the Bat, Batman: Gotham Knights, and Robin.

When computerized colors arrived to comics, the assignments to classic colorists substantially decreased. By 2000 Roy was largely out of work, despite training herself on the computer. Roy spent her last days battling cancer and died in Austin, Texas, at age 57 on December 14, 2010.

Bibliography
Roy's comics work (interior art) include:
Batman
Detective Comics
 "Arizona Desert with Cacti"
 "Grinding Corn"
 "New Jersey Pine Barrens"

References

Nagle, John "A Splash of Color" (https://gyrojohn.medium.com/a-splash-of-color-the-incredible-impact-a-comic-book-colorist-had-on-me-as-a-young-boy-growing-3f27dfcf35cc)

External links
 Adrienne Roy at the Grand Comics Database

1953 births
2010 deaths
American female comics artists
Artists from Austin, Texas